Berberis amabilis is a shrub native to Yunnan and Myanmar (Burma). It grows at elevations of 1800–3300 m.

Berberis amabilis is an evergreen shrub up to 2 m tall, with spines along the younger branches. Leaves are lanceolate, up to 8 cm long. Flowers are produced in groups of as many as 25. Berries are ellipsoid, nearly black, up to 8 mm long.

References

amabilis
Flora of Myanmar
Flora of Yunnan
Plants described in 1939